Mark Logan may refer to:
Mark Logan (politician), British Member of Parliament elected 2019
Mark Logan (cricketer) (born 1960), South African cricketer
One of the pseudonyms of Christopher Nicole (born 1930), British writer
 Mark Logan (American football), player in 1988 Cincinnati Bengals season
Mark Logan, co-writer of Superman vs. Spider-Man XXX